Viscount Boyd of Merton, of Merton-in-Penninghame in the County of Wigtown, is a title in the Peerage of the United Kingdom. It was created in 1960 for the Conservative politician and former Secretary of State for the Colonies, Alan Lennox-Boyd. The Hon. Sir Mark Lennox-Boyd, youngest son of the first Viscount, is also a Conservative politician.  the title is held by his eldest son, the second Viscount, who succeeded in 1983.

The family seat is Ince Castle, near Saltash, Cornwall.

Viscounts Boyd of Merton (1960)
Alan Tindal Lennox-Boyd, 1st Viscount Boyd of Merton (1904–1983)
Simon Donald Rupert Neville Lennox-Boyd, 2nd Viscount Boyd of Merton (b. 1939)

The heir apparent is the present holder's son the Hon. Benjamin Alan Lennox-Boyd (b. 1964).
The heir apparent's heir apparent is his son Alan George Simon Lennox-Boyd (b. 1993).

Line of Succession

  Alan Tindal Lennox-Boyd, 1st Viscount Boyd of Merton (1904 – 1983)
  Simon Donald Rupert Neville Lennox-Boyd, 2nd Viscount Boyd of Merton (born 1939)
 (1) Hon. Benjamin Alan Lennox-Boyd (b. 1964)
 (2) Alan George Simon Lennox-Boyd (b. 1993)
 (3) Henry Simon Lennox-Boyd (b. 1997)
 (4) Hon. Edward George Clive (b. 1968)
 (5) Jago George Antony Clive (b. 1997)
 (6) William Enys Clive (b. 1998)
 (7) Hon. Sir Mark Alexander Lennox-Boyd (b. 1943)

Arms

References

Kidd, Charles, Williamson, David (editors). Debrett's Peerage and Baronetage (1990 edition). New York: St Martin's Press, 1990.

Viscountcies in the Peerage of the United Kingdom
Noble titles created in 1960
Noble titles created for UK MPs